Selph is a surname. Notable people with the surname include:

Carey Selph (1901–1976), American baseball player
Carl Selph (born 1946), American politician
Jimmie Selph (1915–2000), American country music artist
Robert Selph Henry (1889–1970), American lawyer, railroad executive and historian